Zübük (lit. stupid) is a 1980 Turkish comedy film directed by Kartal Tibet. The character was created by humorist Aziz Nesin.

Cast
 Kemal Sunal - İprahim Zübükzade / Zeybekzade Kara Yusuf Efe
 Nevra Serezli - Yektane
 Kadir Savun - Yektane'nin Babası Muhalif Kadir Efendi
 Osman Alyanak - Motelci Satılmış
 Ali Şen - Sabri Ağa
 Bülent Kayabaş - İri Nuri
 Metin Serezli - Gazeteci Yaşar

References

External links 
 

1981 comedy films
1981 films
Films based on Turkish novels
Turkish comedy films
Turkish political films
Films shot in Ankara